Marguerite Shue-wen Chang (張葉學文; June 21, 1923 – May 5, 2012) was a Chinese-born American research chemist and inventor, awarded the Federal Woman's Award in 1973 for her work in the United States Naval Ordnance Laboratory, based in Maryland.

Early life 
Marguerite Shue-wen Ye was born in Nanjing in 1923. She earned a bachelor's degree in chemistry at Wuhan University. She earned a master's degree and a Ph.D. in organic chemistry at Tulane University, where she was an associate member of the Sigma Xi honor society. Her dissertation advisor was Joseph H. Boyer.

Career 
Chang moved to the United States in 1946. From 1959 she worked at the United States Naval Ordnance Laboratory in Maryland, developing propellants for missiles and rockets, working on safety procedures for the manufacture and use of propellants. She was named as an inventor on several patents, assigned to the United States government between 1976 and 1986, for processes, production methods and chemical compositions.

Chang's scientific publications included "The Identification of C32H20N4O8, a Product from Acetophenone and Nitric Acid" (Journal of the American Chemical Society 1960, with Joseph H. Boyer), and "Bis(cyclopropanecarbonyl)furoxan" (Journal of Organic Chemistry 1968, with James U. Lowe Jr.).

Chang is included in Conversations 760-009 and 871-009 of the White House Tapes, in the Oval Office for a photo sessions with President Richard Nixon and others in August 1972 and March 1973. She was one of the six women to receive the Federal Woman's Award in 1973.

Personal life 
Marguerite S. Chang was married to George K. Chang. The couple moved to the United States together in 1946, and had two sons while Marguerite Chang was a graduate student at Tulane University. The Changs decided to stay in the United States after 1949. Marguerite S. Chang died in 2012, aged 88 years, in Palo Alto, California.

References 

Women chemists
Tulane University alumni
Wuhan University alumni
1923 births
2012 deaths
Scientists from Nanjing
Chemists from Jiangsu
People of the Republic of China
Chinese emigrants to the United States